"You and Me" is a song by LL Cool J, released as a single from his ninth album, G.O.A.T.. It was released on October 17, 2000 for Def Jam Recordings, was produced by DJ Scratch and LL Cool J, and featured R&B singer Kelly Price. It peaked at #44 on the Billboard's Hot Rap Singles and #59 on the Hot R&B/Hip-Hop Songs.

Track listing

A-side
"You and Me" (Radio Edit)
"You and Me" (LP Version)
"You and Me" (Instrumental)

Contains a sample from the recording "You'll Never Know" by Hi-Gloss.

B-side
"Fuhgidabowdit" featuring Method Man, Redman, DMX (Radio Edit)
"Fuhgidabowdit" (LP Edit)
"Fuhgidabowdit" (Instrumental)

Charts

References

2000 singles
2000 songs
LL Cool J songs
Kelly Price songs
Def Jam Recordings singles
Songs written by LL Cool J